Taylor is an unincorporated community in Cotton County, Oklahoma, United States. The elevation is 994 feet. It was named after a local merchant, John Taylor. The community had a post office from November 30, 1907 to May 31, 1911.

References

Unincorporated communities in Cotton County, Oklahoma
Unincorporated communities in Oklahoma